Shalimar Bagh also known as Shalimar Garden is a Mughal garden located on the banks of Yamuna river in Delhi, India. It was named as Aizzabad Bagh when the garden was laid by Izz-un-Nissa wife of Mughal emperor Shah Jahan in 1653 AD as a tribute and replica of Shalimar Bagh, Kashmir, laid by erstwhile Mughal emperor Jahangir in 1619 AD, the Shalimar Bagh of Delhi is now abandoned but still houses shade trees, majestic parterre and structure such as Sheesh Mahal and the garden pavilion.

History
In 1653 AD Izz-un-Nissa popularly known by the title "Akbarabadi Mahal" the third wife of Mughal emperor Shah Jahan commissioned Aizzabad Bagh ("later renamed as Shalimar Bagh") in the then vicinity of Shahjahanabad (present-day Old Delhi). Within the Shalimar Bagh, Shah Jahan constructed "Sheesh Mahal" (crystal palace).

The Shalimar Bagh had witnessed events of historical significance such as in 1658 AD the coronation ceremony of Aurangzeb took place at Sheesh Mahal. In 1738 AD enroute to massacre Delhi Nadir Shah along with his army encamped here. In 1803 AD Sir David Ochterlony a British Resident to the Mughal court at Delhi, selected Shalimar Bagh as his summer residence. During the Indian Rebellion of 1857 AD a battle was fought in very place when Delhi was sieged by the troops of East India Company. 

In the Battle of Panipat 3 Ahmad Shah Durrani Stays hear.

Design
This pavilion was built by the Mughal emperor Shah Jahan. Like most Mughal gardens, it had channels of water culminating in ornate tanks and several fountains. The layout is designed in the mughal style of  chaharbagh style. The pavilion has patches of wall-paintings that survived till date.

The Sheesh Mahal (crystal palace) is built on a high plinth facing the parterre with 25 fountains and the surrounding garden consisted of fruit orchards. The archways are circular, the central hall consists with a compartment at either end and an arched hall at the rear. Attached to the main building are vaulted rooms. Painting marks exist on the ceiling.

Further reading
The meaning of "Shalimar", The Express Tribune, Khaled Ahmed, 25 January 2012
इतिहास की कहानी सुनाता शीशमहल, (in Hindi) Navbharat Times, 13 November 2010

Gallery

References

Mughal gardens in India
Tourist attractions in Delhi